Persepolis is an ancient capital city that resided in Persia, in what is now Iran.

Persepolis may also refer to:
 Persepolis F.C., a professional football club based in Tehran, Iran
 Persepolis, an autobiographical graphic novel by Marjane Satrapi
 Persepolis (film), a 2007 French-Iranian-American animated film
 Persepolis, a piece of music composed by Iannis Xenakis
 Persepolis, an Iranian warship commissioned in 1885 and in service until 1925
 Persepolis, an Anomaly series of Ingress